Torbjörn Lassenius (born 4 August 1931) is a Finnish athlete. He competed in the men's decathlon at the 1956 Summer Olympics.

References

External links
 

1931 births
Living people
Athletes (track and field) at the 1956 Summer Olympics
Finnish decathletes
Olympic athletes of Finland
Athletes from Helsinki